Dini Beyk (also Romanized as Dīnī Beyk; also known as Dīn Beyg and Dīnī Bak) is a village in Shivanat Rural District, Afshar District, Khodabandeh County, Zanjan Province, Iran. At the 2006 census, its population was 114, in 23 families.

References 

Populated places in Khodabandeh County